Castelijn or Castelijns is a Dutch surname. Notable people with the surname include:

Boudewijn Castelijn, Dutch field hockey coach and trainer
Twan Castelijns (born 1989), Dutch cyclist

Dutch-language surnames